Phallus coronatus is a species of fungus belonging to the genus Phallus. It is found in Vietnam. It was documented in 2014.

References 

Phallales
Fungi of Asia